Cheshmeh Sarnajeh (also Romanized as Cheshmeh Serenjeh) is a village in Dorud Rural District, in the Central District of Dorud County, Lorestan Province, Iran. At the 2006 census, its population was 479, in 102 families.

References 

Towns and villages in Dorud County